The Canadian Journal of Linguistics (French: Revue canadienne de linguistique) is a triannual peer-reviewed academic journal covering theoretical and applied linguistics. It is published by Cambridge University Press on behalf of the Canadian Linguistic Association. The journal was established in 1954 as the Journal of the Canadian Linguistic Association.  It changed its name to the current title in 1961.  The editor-in-chief is Heather Newell (Université du Québec à Montréal). The co-editor is Daniel Siddiqi.

Abstracting and indexing
The journal is abstracted and indexed in the Arts and Humanities Citation Index, Current Contents/Arts & Humanities, and Scopus.

References

External links

Linguistics journals
Publications established in 1954
Multilingual journals
Triannual journals
Cambridge University Press academic journals
Academic journals associated with learned and professional societies of Canada